Northwest Immigrant Rights Project (NWIRP) is a non-profit legal services organization in Washington state. NWIRP's mission is to promote justice by defending and advancing the rights of immigrants through direct legal services, systemic advocacy, and community education.

History

Founded in 1984, the project was created to address the legal needs of Central American refugees and others who were able to legalize their status under Amnesty programs.
NWIRP has grown significantly in scope and currently serves more than 10,000 low-income immigrants per year from more than 100 countries across Latin America, Asia, the Middle East, Eastern and Western Europe and Africa.

Offices

NWIRP has four offices in Washington State. The Seattle Office serves immigrant communities in Western Washington.  The Granger Office (in the Yakima Valley) and the Wenatchee Office, serve the immigrant communities in Eastern Washington. The fourth office, located in Tacoma, focuses solely on serving the 1575 persons detained at the Northwest Detention Center (owned and operated by the GEO Group).

Areas of practice

NWIRP provides direct representation to individuals who are applying for political asylum, family visas, lawful status under the Violence Against Women Act, and naturalization or citizenship. NWIRP also provides direct representation, defending individuals who are placed in removal proceedings (deportation proceedings). In addition, supported by a grant from the Executive Office for Immigration Review of the U.S. Department of Justice, NWIRP provides legal orientation sessions to all persons detained at the Northwest Detention Center in Tacoma, Washington, who are placed in removal proceedings.

Impact Litigation

Apart from representing individuals in administrative proceedings, NWIRP also provides direct representation before the federal district courts in Washington State and the Ninth Circuit Court of Appeals. These are impact litigation cases, designed to affect large numbers of people and bring about meaningful social change through setting precedents.

NWIRP is co-counsel with the ACLU, Public Counsel and Mental Health Advocacy Services, in Franco-Gonzales, et al. v. Holder, et al., CV , in the Central District of California, where the Court granted class certification and issued a permanent injunction, ordering DHS and DOJ to appoint defenders to all detained individuals in Washington, California and Arizona who have a mental illness or disability rendering them incapable of representing themselves in detention or removal proceedings. The Court initially granted motions for preliminary injunctive relief on behalf of the named plaintiffs.  Thereafter, the court certified a class of similarly situated individuals in Washington, California and Arizona. Finally, the Court granted Plaintiffs’ motion for partial summary judgment, requiring the government to assign qualified legal representatives for class members.  DOJ then announced a plan to provide appointed counsel nationwide to similarly situated individuals.

In 2013, NWIRP and the American Immigration Council, along with co-counsel from the Seattle law firm Gibbs Houston Pauw and the Massachusetts Law Reform Institute, successfully concluded a nationwide class action filed on behalf of asylum applicants who were prevented from obtaining employment authorization. The complaint challenged widespread problems with the "asylum clock" – the system government agencies use to determine when immigrants who have applied for asylum may obtain permission to work lawfully in the United States. Ultimately, Defendants agreed to a settlement with the nationwide certified class, which was approved by federal District Judge Jones. A.B.T. v. U.S. Citizenship and Immigration Services,  2013 WL 5913323 (W.D.Wash.) (W.D.Wash. 2013). Among the benefits of the settlement: asylum seekers with Immigration Court cases may now present their asylum applications to the Court immediately, without having to wait months for an initial hearing before an Immigration Judge; certain asylum seekers whose cases have been pending on appeal will now be able to obtain work authorization when the Board of Immigration Appeals remands their case to an Immigration Judge; asylum seekers and their attorneys will be provided with more effective notice so that they do not inadvertently accept hearing dates which frustrate obtaining a work authorization. In addition, even under the "expedited" process asylum seekers and their attorneys will be provided at least 45 days from the date they file their asylum application in court to prepare for an individual hearing. See EOIR OPPM 13-03, December 2, 2013)(EOIR memorandum implementing policies to comply with A.B.T. settlement).

In 2013, NWIRP, again teaming up with the ACLU and co-counsel from the law firm of Gibbs Houston, filed a class action on behalf of persons detained at the Northwest Detention Center in Tacoma, Washington, who had been denied a bond hearing, purportedly pursuant to the mandatory detention statute. The class action  successfully challenged the overbroad application of a statute that allows the government to keep persons in removal proceedings locked up without even the opportunity for a bond hearing. On March 11, 2014, Judge Jones, of the federal district court in Western Washington certified the class and granted declaratory relief, ruling that the government did not have the authority to apply "mandatory detention" to the class members. Khoury v. Asher, -- F.Supp.2d --, 2014 WL 954920 (W.D.Wash. 2014)

In another far reaching case NWIRP, the ACLU of Washington State and the law firm of Stoel Rives filed a class action  in the Western District of Washington challenging the government's obstruction of hundreds of applicants seeking naturalization, all of whom had already passed the necessary exams and demonstrated that they had no disqualifying criminal records. Some of the plaintiffs had applications pending for up to four years. Judge Pechman granted plaintiffs’ motion for class certification. Thereafter she denied Defendants’ motion to dismiss, leading to an eventual settlement where government agreed to complete adjudication of all 450 delayed applications prior to registration deadline for 2008 elections. Roshandel v. Chertoff, 2008 WL 1969646 (W.D.Wash. 2008) Similar litigation was pending throughout the country but this was the first class certified on this issue in the United States. In Roshandel v. Chertoff, the District Court certified the district wide class of applicants for naturalization whose applications had not been timely adjudicated after their interview, as a result of the agency's failure to complete the namecheck. The class covered over 450 applicants whose applications had been indefinitely placed on hold by the government. After the Court's order granting class certification Plaintiffs filed for summary judgment. The government then agreed to settle the case, a settlement which ensured that all applications would be adjudicated in time for the entire class to vote in the November 2008 elections.

In addition, NWIRP has successfully represented individuals on several published decisions, including:

In Bromfield v. Mukasey, a published decision that received widespread attention, the Court found through the record of proceedings that there is a pattern and practice of persecution against gay men in Jamaica. The EOIR also erred by failing to recognize that the Jamaican government not only acquiesces in the torture of gay men, but is also directly involved in such torture. The Court further clarified that even where a petitioner has been found removable based upon an aggravated felony the Court retains jurisdiction to review claims for withholding of removal and relief under the Convention Against Torture if the denial was based upon the merits of the claim.

Other published decisions include:

Chay Ixcot v. Holder, 646 F.3d 1202, (9th Cir. June 1, 2011).  The Court ruled that the agency violated the law by trying to reinstate a prior deportation order rather than first completing adjudication of his pending application for political asylum.  The Court ruled that applying the new reinstatement law that was enacted three years after he applied in order to deprive Mr. Chay Ixcot of the right to have his pending asylum application heard would have an unlawful retroactive effect at it "would impair rights a party possessed when he acted."

Lopez-Birrueta v. Holder, 633 F.3d 1211(9th Cir. 2011).  The Court found that the Immigration Judge and Board of Immigration Appeals erred in applying a restrictive interpretation of battery for purposes of establishing eligibility for cancellation of removal for victims of domestic violence.  In this case, Ms. Lopez’ children had been beaten with a stick when they were two and three years old.  Nonetheless, the Immigration Judge found that since there was no lasting injury it did not demonstrate a heightened level of violence necessary to qualify for relief for victims of domestic violence.  The Court swept aside the agency's determination clarifying that there is no requirement for a heightened level of violence.  The court also rejected the government's position that the immigration court could consider state-law definitions when determining what is required under this federal law.  The Ninth Circuit concluded that the undisputed evidence of physical abuse that M.L.B.’s children suffered clearly met the standard necessary for protection under VAWA.

Franco-Gonzales v. Holder, -- F.Supp.2d --, 2010 WL 5874537 (C.D.Cal. Dec. 27, 2010) The Court granted preliminary injunction for named plaintiffs,  finding as a matter of first impression that mentally incompetent plaintiffs were entitled to reasonable accommodation of appointment of counsel, under the Rehabilitation Act and also ruling that Plaintiffs were entitled to a custody hearing.

Cortez-Guillen v. Holder, 623 F.3d 933 (9th Cir. 2010).  The Court ruled that the agency erred in  ordering the petitioner removed.  The Court reiterated that the agency is bound by the elements of the crime, even with regards to the realistic probability test.  A such, the Alaskan coercion statute does not categorically qualify as aggravated felony crime of violence as it may encompass threats regarding unlawful conduct that are not violent crimes.  The petitioner been a lawful permanent resident for almost thirty years.

Doissaint v. Mukasey: The Court ruled that the Board of Immigration Appeals ("BIA") had erred in failing to address the Petitioner's arguments as to eligibility for protection under the Convention Against Torture (CAT). The Court also held that the BIA could not try to cure its own error by denying a motion to reopen by the petitioner;

Mandujano-Real v. Mukasey: The Court ruled that an identity theft conviction does not qualify as an aggravated felony theft conviction for immigration purposes because the elements of the identity theft statute encompass many forms of conduct that do not fall under the common law definition of theft.  The Court also clarified that it was not appropriate to remand the case to the BIA where the BIA's interpretation was not entitled to deference and the BIA had an opportunity to address the issues presented.  Finally, the Court reconfirmed that the government may not rely upon an individual's concession of removability that is incorrect as a legal matter;

Suazo-Perez v. Mukasey: The Court held that the Immigration Judge and Board of Immigration Appeals erred in finding that the petitioner's misdemeanor conviction for assault constituted a crime of violence and thus rendered him deportable despite his lawful permanent resident status;

Hosseini v. Gonzales: The Court found that an applicant for relief who has been identified as a supporter of a counterrevolutionary group in Iran qualifies for relief under the Convention Against Torture even where the individual had not experienced past torture;

Hernandez-Guadarrama v. Ashcroft: In this case, the Court reaffirmed an often-ignored principle: that the government cannot use statements against non-citizens in removal proceedings without making a reasonable attempt to have the affiants available for cross-examination. This point is especially crucial where the government itself removed the affiants instead of making them available at the removal proceedings;

Cuevas-Gaspar v. Gonzales:  The Court held that a conviction for burglary in the State of Washington does not categorically constitute a crime involving moral turpitude. In addition, the Court ruled the lawful admission and residence of the parents can be imputed to a minor child for purposes of qualifying for cancellation of removal;

Perez-Gonzalez v. Ashcroft: The Court found that certain individuals with prior deportation orders are nonetheless entitled to have their applications for adjustment of status to lawful permanent residence along with the necessary waivers adjudicated before the government can moved to reinstate the prior order of removal. The Court held that notwithstanding the prior deportation or removal orders, such individuals are still eligible to become permanent residents. Before Perez-Gonzalez, the vast majority of these individuals were being summarily deported without a hearing and denied the opportunity to become permanent residents;

Garcia-Lopez v. Ashcroft: The Court ruled that, (1) prior offense of grand theft would not be considered misdemeanor under California statute providing that "wobbler" offense was to be treated as misdemeanor after judgment imposed punishment other than imprisonment in state prison, but (2) California court's declaration that such offense was misdemeanor was binding on BIA;

Castro-Cortez v. Ashcroft:  The Court found that it had jurisdiction to directly review administrative reinstatement orders, and that the provision of Illegal Immigration Reform and Immigrant Responsibility Act (IIRIRA) permitting INS to reinstate prior orders of removal did not apply retroactively.

Advocacy work and press

Challenging the use of Border Patrol agents as "interpreters" 

NWIRP represented an individual filing a complaint against the U.S.Forest Service, challenging their practice of stopping individuals, and then calling Border Patrol agents to assist. The complaint stemmed from an incident in May 2011 in which a U.S. Forest Service officer called Border Patrol during a routine stop in the Olympic Peninsula, which ultimately resulted in the death of the partner of the complainant. In response, the Department of Agriculture conducted a full investigation and ultimately issued a decision finding that the U.S. Forest Service discriminated against Latinos on the Olympic Peninsula by using Border Patrol agents as interpreters and as law-enforcement support in routine matters. The Office of the Assistant Secretary for Civil Rights, known as OASCR, ordered the Forest Service to make significant policy changes at the national level to remedy its discriminatory policies and practices. In addition, the office directed that additional steps be taken at the Olympic National Forest offices in Washington State.

"We believe this is the first legal ruling addressing the issue of whether the use of Border Patrol agents as interpreters violates civil rights protections and we are pleased that this federal agency has concluded unambiguously that this practice is discriminatory," said Jorge L. Barón, executive director of Northwest Immigrant Rights Project.

The decision in this case came less than a month after NWIRP filed a separate complaint with the U.S. Departments of Justice and Homeland Security regarding the use of Border Patrol agents for interpretation assistance by other law enforcement agencies throughout Washington State.  In response to the complaint and the prior ruling issued by the DOA, DHS then announced a new policy generally prohibiting Border Patrol agents from acting as interpreters for other officials.

Support for LGBT issues 

In June 2011, NWIRP joined immigration and gay rights organizations from around the country in signing Lambda Legal's letter to Secretary Janet Napolitano and Immigration and Customs Enforcement (ICE) officials in urging the Department of Homeland Security to examine cases of abuse against LGBT  people and people with HIV/AIDS in immigration detention. The letter also called for standardized guidelines and protocol for the treatment of LGBT people and people with HIV/AIDS while they are in detention, including assigning improper housing to transgender persons, not providing adequate medical treatment for those with HIV/AIDS, denying medications and hormone treatments to transgender persons, and allowing "rampant sexual, physical and mental abuse of LGBT detainees."

Denouncement of "Secure Communities" Program 

NWIRP does not support the "Secure Communities" Program, which would inject local law enforcement into immigration enforcement roles. As of June 2011, several Washington State counties had announced their intention to participate in the program.
NWIRP Executive Director Jorge Baron expressed the organization's opinion: "We believe that ‘Secure Communities’ will encourage racial profiling practices and further erode immigrant communities’ trust in local law enforcement agencies. As a consequence, victims, witnesses
and other immigrant community members will be reticent to approach local law enforcement."

Partners

NWIRP is partnered with several other immigrant rights and law firms in Washington, including Volunteer Advocates for Immigrant Justice (VAIJ), American Immigrant Lawyer's Association (AILA), American Immigration Council (AIC) and the Law Offices of Van Der Hout, Brigagliano & Nightingale, LLP, and the Alliance for Equal Justice.

NWIRP also trains law students and pro bono attorneys through the Immigrant Family Advocacy Project at the University of Washington School of Law, and refers cases to them. NWIRP attorneys frequently instruct at a joint NWIRP/UW Immigration Law Clinic designed to serve low-income asylum seekers. NWIRP also refers some domestic violence cases to the Immigration Law Clinic at the Seattle University School of Law.

Golden Door Award 

Northwest Immigrant Rights Project (NWIRP) presents the Golden Door Award to one organization or individual for their outstanding work promoting justice and dignity for immigrants and refugees. Nominees have often furthered the cause of immigrant and refugee rights on a national, state, or local level. Previous award recipients include:

2009 Radio KSVR 91.7
2008 Jana Heyd
2007 Colors NW Magazine: Victoria Cherniak and the Newcomers Resource Project of the King County Bar Association
2006 Annie Benson: El Comite Pro Amnistia
2005 Rep. Phyllis Gutierrez Kenney: Jill Dutton
2004 Legal Foundation of Washington: T he Sanctuary Movement: Dr. Richard Kovar
2003 Atieno Odhiambo: David Ayala
2002 Diane Narasaki: Nieves Negrete
2001 Guadalupe Gamboa: Roberta Ray
2000 KDNA Radio: Jay Stansel': Jennifer Wellman
1999 Bob & Gracie Ekblad and Vince Brown: Grance Huang & Rebecca Smith

Amicus Award 
The annual Amicus Award recognizes a law firm that has "shown exceptional participation and dedication to the pro bono legal representation of immigrants and refugees." Previous award recipients include:

2009 Matthew Geyman (Phillips Law Group)
2008 Williams Kastner for its pro bono representation of low-income individuals seeking political asylum.
2007 Professor Anita Ramasastry and the Immigrant Families Advocacy Project of the University of Washington School of Law
2006 Bob Pauw and Bob Gibbs, Law Office of Gibbs Houston Pauw
2005 Cozen O' Connor
2004 Perkins Coie

References

External links

 

Immigrant rights organizations in the United States
1984 establishments in Washington (state)
Organizations established in 1984
501(c)(3) organizations
Non-profit organizations based in Washington (state)